Lawrence Anwan Nicholas (born 17 May 2001) is a Nigerian footballer who plays as a midfielder for Turkish club Fatih Karagümrük.

Club career
Nicholas made his debut in the Russian Premier League for Tambov on 5 December 2020 in a game against Spartak Moscow, coming on for Dmitri Merenchukov in the 85th minute. On 13 December 2020 he made his first start for Tambov in a game against Rubin Kazan.

On 18 February 2022, Nicholas signed a contract with Russian Premier League side FC Khimki until the end of the 2023–24 season. On 21 July 2022, his contract with Khimki was terminated by mutual consent.

On 30 July 2022, he signed with Fatih Karagümrük in Turkey.

Personal life
Nicholas is registered as his last name by the Russian Premier League and he is listed under that last name on the official site of FC Tambov. However, other sources list "Anwan" as his last name (with the full name Nicholas Lawrence Anwan) or "Lawrence" as his last name (with the full name Anwan Nicholas Lawrence).

Career statistics

References

2001 births
Living people
Nigerian footballers
Association football midfielders
FC Tambov players
FC Olimp-Dolgoprudny players
FC Khimki players
Fatih Karagümrük S.K. footballers
Russian Premier League players
Russian First League players
Nigerian expatriate footballers
Expatriate footballers in Russia
Nigerian expatriate sportspeople in Russia
Expatriate footballers in Turkey
Nigerian expatriate sportspeople in Turkey